Oddmund Jarle Finnseth (born 11 February 1957 in Sortland, Norway) is a Norwegian jazz musician (upright bass), composer and music teacher.

Biography 
Finnseth studied music on the Jazz program at Trondheim musikkonservatorium (1983–86) and joined the Asmund Bjørken Orchestra during the time of his studies. Later he has recorded albums with  'Bjørn Krokfoss Octet' and the band 'Bossa Nordpå' (1993–) of Marit Sandvik. He was part of the Randy Johnston tour, led by Øystein Norvoll for the 'Nordnorsk Jazzsenter' (2002).

Finnseth teaches music at the high school 'Sortland videregående skole' and 'Heggen videregående skole' in Harstad, and play in the bands 'Sortland Storband' and 'Steinar Kjeldsen Quartet'. He was portreted by Andreas Lunnan in the radio show Sølvsuper, at NRK radio in 2007, and was awarded the Stubøprisen 2015.

Honors 
2015: Stubøprisen awarded during Festspillene i Nordnorge

Discography 
With Arvid Genius
1983: Rainy City Swing (Herman Records)

With Sven Nyhus & Asmund Bjørken Sextet
2008: Bergroser Og Frøsøminner (Heilo Music)

References 

Norwegian jazz composers
Avant-garde jazz double-bassists
Norwegian jazz upright-bassists
Male double-bassists
Musicians from Nordland
People from Sortland
1957 births
Living people
21st-century double-bassists
21st-century Norwegian male musicians